Gobio bulgaricus is a species of gudgeon, a small freshwater in the family Cyprinidae. It is found in the Aegean basin, from the Maritza to Aliakmon drainages in Turkey, Bulgaria, Greece

References

 

Gobio
Fish described in 1926
Cyprinid fish of Europe